was a town located in Toyota District, Hiroshima Prefecture, Japan.

As of 2003, the town had an estimated population of 10,017 and a density of 594.48 persons per km2. The total area was 16.85 km2.

On April 1, 2004, Kawajiri was merged into the expanded city of Kure and no longer exists as an independent municipality.

External links
 Official website of Kure in Japanese (some English content)

Dissolved municipalities of Hiroshima Prefecture